Events in the year 1946 in Brazil.

Incumbents

Federal government
 President: José Linhares (until 30 January); Marshal Eurico Gaspar Dutra (from 31 January)
 Vice President: Nereu Ramos (from 31 September)

Governors 
 Alagoas: Antonio Guedes de Miranda 
 Amazonas: Siseno Sarmento
 Bahia: João Vicente Bulcão Viana then Guilherme Carneiro da Rocha Marback then Cândido Caldas 
 Ceará: 
 till 10 January: Benedito Augusto Carvalho dos Santos
 10 January-21 January: Tomás Pompeu Filho
 21 January-16 February: Acrísio Moreira da Rocha
 16 February-28 October: Pedro Firmeza
 from 28 October: José Machado Lopes
 Espírito Santo: 
 till 27 February: Octávio de Carvalho Lemgruber
 27 February-8 June: Aristides Alexandre Campos
 8 June-14 October: Ubaldo Ramalhete Maia
 from 14 October: Moacir Ubirajara da Silva 
 Goiás: 
 till 18 February: Eládio de Amorim
 18 February-4 August: Filipe Antônio Xavier de Barros 
 4 August-18 August: Paulo Fleury da Silva e Sousa
 18 August-12 September: Filipe Antônio Xavier de Barros
 12 September-22 October: Belarmino Cruvinel
 from 22 October: Joaquim Machado de Araújo
 Maranhão: 
 Mato Grosso: Olegário de Barros then Jose Marcelo Moreira 
 Minas Gerais: 
 till 3 February: Nísio Batista de Oliveira 
 3 February-14 August: João Tavares Corrêa Beraldo
 14 August-16 November: Júlio Ferreira de Carvalho
 16 November-20 December: Noraldino Lima 
 from 20 December: Alcides Lins 
 Pará:
 till 9 February: Manuel Maroja Neto 
 9 February-9 December: Otávio Bastos Meira
 from 9 December: José Faustino Santos
 Paraíba: 
 till 13 February: Severino Montenegro
 13 February-20 September: Odon Bezerra Cavalcanti
 from 20 September: José Gomes da Silva
 Paraná: Clotário de Macedo Portugal then Brasil Pinheiro Machado then Mário Gomes da Silva 
 Pernambuco: 
 till 7 February: José Neves Filho
 7 February-7 August: José Domingues da Silva
 from 7 August: Demerval Peixoto
 Piaui: Hugo Silva
 Rio de Janeiro: 
 till 20 March: Benedito Martins Napoleão do Rego
 20 March-3 September: José Vitorino Correia
 3 September-11 October: Manuel Sotero Vaz da Silveira
 from 11 October: Teodoro Sobral
 Rio Grande do Norte: Miguel Seabra Fagundes (till 13 February); Ubaldo Bezerra de Melo (from 13 February)
 Rio Grande do Sul: Samuel Figueiredo da Silva 
(till 7 February); Pompílio Cylon Fernandes Rosa (from 7 February)
 Santa Catarina: Luís Gallotti (till 8 February); Udo Deeke (from 8 February)
 São Paulo: José Carlos de Macedo Soares 
 Sergipe: Hunald Santaflor Cardoso (till 31 March); Antônio de Freitas Brandão (from 31 March)

Vice governors 
 Rio Grande do Norte: no vice governor
 São Paulo: no vice governor

Events

18 September - A new constitution is introduced, and the position of Vice President of Brazil is recreated; Nereu Ramos is selected as the first incumbent.
date unknown - The new airline, Transportes Aéreos Nacional, is founded (but does not fly until the following year).

Arts and culture

Books
Jorge Amado - Seara Vermelha
Maria José Dupré - Os Rodriguez

Drama
Nelson Rodrigues - Álbum de família

Films
Caídos do Céu, directed by Luiz de Barros

Births
1 January - Roberto Rivelino, footballer
12 April - Nelson Jobim, politician
4 May - Rogério Sganzerla, film director (died 2004)
19 May - Carlos Alberto de Barros Franco, pneumologist
18 June - Maria Bethânia, singer
6 July - Toquinho, singer and guitarist
29 September - Celso Pitta, politician (died 2009)
2 November - Marieta Severo, actress
12 December - Emerson Fittipaldi, racing driver

Deaths
9 February - Júlio Prestes, President of Brazil 1927-30 (born 1882)
19 May - Francesco Camero Medici, Brazilian-born Italian diplomat (born 1886)
15 June – João Batista Becker, German-born Brazilian Roman Catholic prelate, archbishop (born 1870)

References

See also 
1946 in Brazilian football
List of Brazilian films of 1946

 
1940s in Brazil
Years of the 20th century in Brazil
Brazil
Brazil